Julio César Enciso or Julio Enciso may refer to:

 Julio César Enciso (footballer, born 1974), Paraguayan association football player
 Julio Enciso (footballer, born 2004), Paraguayan association football player